Windwalker is a 1981 Western film directed by Kieth Merrill and written by Ray Goldrup, based on a novel by Blaine M. Yorgason. It stars Trevor Howard and Nick Ramus.

Plot
Windwalker is an aged Cheyenne warrior. As a young husband and father, he watched helplessly as his wife, Tashina, was killed and one of their twin sons kidnapped during a raid by rival Crow warriors.  After many years of searching unsuccessfully for this son, Windwalker dies during the winter of 1797 in what will become the state of Utah.

After Windwalker's funeral, his remaining son, Smiling Wolf, leads his family south to rejoin the rest of the tribe; on the way they are attacked by a band of Crow warriors and after fighting them off, Smiling Wolf is badly injured and the family is forced to hide.

The Great Spirit reawakens Windwalker, and after battling the forces of nature and his own physical frailty, he rejoins his family. Using Cheyenne medicine to heal Smiling Wolf's wounds, Windwalker leads the family to a sacred Cheyenne hiding cave. From there, he and Smiling Wolf's two young sons prepare booby traps for the Crow raiding party, all of which work perfectly, leaving only the raiding party leader and one other warrior.

The Crow warrior is captured and taken to the cave, where he is revealed to be Windwalker's long-lost son. With his family safe and his son restored to him, Windwalker confronts his old enemy and offers him peace, but the Crow refuses, forcing a final battle. The restored son fights the Crow leader in his father's place and is victorious. With his family safe and restored, Windwalker is now free to proceed to the afterlife, where he is reunited with Tashina.

Main cast
Trevor Howard as Windwalker
Nick Ramus as Smiling Wolf/Crow Brother/Narrator
James Remar as Windwalker as a young man
Serene Hedin as Tashina
Dusty McCrea as Dancing Moon
Silvana Gallardo as Little Feather
Emerson John as Spotted Deer
Bart the Bear as The Bear (film debut)

Production and release

Windwalker was shot in various outdoor locations in Utah including the Wasatch Mountains. To maintain authenticity to the story, the film's dialogue is subtitled in English with Cheyenne and Crow languages spoken. Chief Dan George was tapped to play Windwalker but became ill, apparently leading Merrill to ask Trevor Howard, an English actor, to take the role. James Remar was already slated to play the main character as a young man. Thus, languages were used to attempt a sense of authenticity, both young and old Windwalker were played by white actors.

Reception
Famous movie critics Siskel and Ebert both gave the film an enthusiastic review. With their signature two thumbs up.

See also
Hollywood Indian
Portrayals of Native Americans in film

References

External links

1980 films
1981 Western (genre) films
American Western (genre) films
Films directed by Kieth Merrill
Films about Native Americans
Films shot in Utah
1980 drama films
1981 drama films
1981 films
1980s American films